Freddy Emir Montaña Cadena (born November 23, 1982 in Aquitania, Boyacá) is a Colombian road cyclist, who currently rides for UCI Continental team .

Major results

2005
 10th Overall Doble Copacabana Grand Prix Fides
1st Stage 3 (TTT)
2006
 2nd Overall Doble Copacabana Grand Prix Fides
 6th Overall Doble Sucre Potosí GP Cemento Fancesa
2008
 3rd Clásica Internacional de Bogotá
2009
 1st Overall Vuelta a Boyacá
1st Stage 3
 2nd Overall Vuelta a Colombia
 2nd Overall Vuelta Ciclista a León
1st Stage 4
 3rd Clasica Alcaldía de Pasca
 3rd Subida a Urkiola
2010
 3rd Time trial, Pan American Road Championships
 6th Overall Vuelta Mexico Telmex
 7th Overall Vuelta a Colombia
2011
 2nd Overall Vuelta Ciclista a Costa Rica
1st Stage 8 (ITT)
 3rd Overall Vuelta a Colombia
1st Stage 15
 7th Overall Vuelta Ciclista Chiapas
2012
 8th Overall Vuelta a Colombia
2013
 1st Stage 11 Vuelta a Colombia
2014
 5th Overall Vuelta a Colombia
2017
 1st Stage 1 (TTT) Vuelta a Colombia
2020
 6th Overall Tour Colombia

References

External links

 

1982 births
Living people
Colombian male cyclists
Vuelta a Colombia stage winners
Sportspeople from Boyacá Department
21st-century Colombian people